The Boomerang 20 is a sailboat that was designed by Eric Maizey in the late 1960s to race and cruise on Port Phillip in Melbourne Australia, sheltered water but choppy conditions. The original boats were built at the family home in Frankston with the assistance of the kids and neighbours in cold moulded ply. As interest grew and production increased, the majority were fibreglass construction. The hulls were built by contractors such as Bruce Orchard and fitted out at the Maizey home until the growing business took up residence in a factory in Kookaburra St. Frankston. Boomerangs began appearing at major regattas in increasing numbers, and their reputation for excellent sailing qualities and bulletproof design grew with their successful racing results. The class soon gained JOG qualification and so could race in the relevant offshore events. After Eric Maizey's untimely death, the business was sold and the Boomerang was built in Victoria, Australia, by Maison (Maizey and Son) Marine in the 1970s and later by Peninsula Yachts. The class association continued to grow. Many hundreds have been built over a 25-year period, and there are quite a few still around the waterways. The Boomerang 20 has always been a classic. It is one of the all-time best-sellers of the 20-foot trailer sailers,

Specifications 

I = 7.31 m

J = 2.517 m

P = 6.325 m

E = 2.362 m

Sailing details 
Handicaps;	PHRF	=,
		Portsmouth	=,
		IRC		=,
Class based Handicaps	
CBH (AUST.)	= 0.640 drop keel, 0.620 swing keel,	
			Other	= 	

Sailing characteristics

Notable performances

Accommodation 
Number of crew to race  =4, Berths =4, Galley =, Head =, Navigation =, Maximum headroom =,

Special features 
Vertical lift or swing centreboards available.

Construction 
 Country of origin Australia (Melbourne)
Hull material Moulded fibreglass
Manufacturer Peninsular yachts
Plans availability No

References 
 Magazine Trailer Sailing 1985, No 3, page 79, Publisher Michael Hannan

External links 
Class Association https://web.archive.org/web/20080325062125/http://www.yachte.com.au/classes/boomerang-20.asp

Sailing in Australia
Trailer sailers
1960s sailboat type designs